Wayne Douglas Stetina (born December 4, 1953) is a former American cyclist. He competed at the 1972 Summer Olympics and 1976 Summer Olympics. He is the brother of Dale, Joel and Troy Stetina and the uncle of Peter Stetina.

Major results

1972
2nd Road race, National Amateur Road Championships
1975
1st  Time trial, National Road Championships
1st Overall Fitchburg Longsjo Classic
1st Tour of Kansas City
1976
1st  Road race, National Amateur Road Championships
1st Tour of Kansas City
1977
1st  Road race, National Amateur Road Championships
1st Overall Coors Classic
1st Overall Fitchburg Longsjo Classic
1978
1st Overall Fitchburg Longsjo Classic
2nd Cat's Hill Classic
3rd Overall Coors Classic
1979
3rd Overall Coors Classic
1980
1st  Time trial, National Road Championships
2nd Road race, National Amateur Road Championships
1981
1st Tour of Somerville
3rd Overall Nevada City Classic
1985
1st  Road race, National Amateur Road Championships
1986
1st Manhattan Beach Grand Prix

References

External links

 

1953 births
Living people
American male cyclists
Olympic cyclists of the United States
Cyclists at the 1972 Summer Olympics
Cyclists at the 1976 Summer Olympics
Sportspeople from Cleveland
Cyclists from Indiana
Pan American Games medalists in cycling
Pan American Games gold medalists for the United States
Medalists at the 1979 Pan American Games